Bhag is a city located within Kachhi District of Balochistan Province of Pakistan. It is the largest city of the district and sits at an altitude of 90 meters (298 feet).

Prior to 2013, Bhag Tehsil was located within Kachhi District before being split off to become part of Lehri District (along with Lehri Tehsil) within Sibi Division, which that district would later be absorbed into Sibi District in 2018.

Also, Bolan and Kachhi are used interchangeable.

The city comprises the majority of the Baloch and Jamot tribes, while a smaller population of Birahvis and Pashtun can also be found.  The tribes consist of:

 Pashtun tribes: Qazi, Raisani
 Baloch tribes: Chhalgari, Rind, Mastoi, Mugheri, Lund, Babbar, Gola, Jatoi, Goya and Pahore.
 Sindhi tribes:Attar, Hanbhi, Kalwar, Abro, Airy, Machhi, Sheikh, Bohar and Soomro.
 Birahvi tribes: Lehri, Bangulzai, Babbar and Shahwani (which are the least populated). 
 Rajput tribes: Bhatti 

A large majority of residents are Hindus, serving primarily as traders and playing a vital role in business. The eponymous Bhagnari community, now mostly located in Mumbai, originated in Bhag.

The tehsil comprises one municipal committee and four union councils.  The municipal committee is Bhag, and the union councils are: Naushehra, Jalal Khan, Chhalgari, and Mehram.

References

Populated places in Sibi District

simple:Bhag Tehsil

ur:بھاگ